The Climate Leadership Council is a bipartisan non-profit organization that advocates for a carbon fee and dividends policy that would tax carbon emissions and refund all the money to Americans in payments of approximately $2,000 a year for a family of four. The plan would reduce emissions by 50 percent by 2035, according to an economic model by Resources for the Future.

Launched in 2017 by Ted Halstead and former Republican Secretaries of State James Baker and George Shultz, the Council has organized a coalition of companies, environmental organizations, economists and others in support of its climate proposal.

Baker-Shultz Carbon Dividends Plan 
The Council’s carbon tax and dividends proposal is known as the Baker-Shultz Carbon Dividends Plan. The plan proposes taxing fossil fuels companies on carbon emissions and paying out rebates to Americans. The proposal includes four pillars:

 Charge fossil fuels companies a fee for their carbon emissions. 
 Give all the money directly back to the American people through quarterly checks. 
 Remove carbon regulations that are no longer necessary so businesses can innovate and invest in a clean energy future; and
 Compel other countries such as China and India to reduce emissions by charging a fee on the carbon content of imported products.

In 2019, the Climate Leadership Council organized the Economists' Statement on Carbon Dividends, which was signed by over 3,500 U.S. economists.

In February 2020, the Council published its bipartisan climate roadmap which detailed the dividends proposal. The plan includes increasing carbon taxes gradually, starting at $40 per ton, and paying out dividends to Americans through quarterly payments, starting at $2000 for a family of four in the first year. The Council also assembled a group of executives, environmentalists and financial experts to advocate for their carbon dividends plan as a way to reduce greenhouse gas emissions to the bipartisan Senate Climate Solutions Caucus.

Benefits of carbon dividends 
In addition to lowering CO2 emissions, research and modeling has shown that the plan would also generate $1.4 trillion in new capital investment in innovation and create 1.6 million new jobs by 2035 in clean-energy technologies like electric vehicles, solar panels, carbon capture technologies, and offshore wind farms.

A report, America’s Carbon Advantage, published in 2020 argues that the U.S. economy would emerge as a global winner from a border adjustable carbon fee included in the Council's plan in part because American-manufactured goods are 40 percent more carbon efficient than the world average. Overseas manufacturers looking to export their goods to the U.S. would pay a U.S. carbon import fee. As a result, American businesses that are more efficient stand to benefit.

The Council also published a study by NERA Economic Consulting in 2020 asserting that a carbon dividends model would generate more economic output compared with using commonly proposed climate regulations to achieve the same emissions reductions. By 2036, U.S. annual gross domestic product (GDP) would be $190 billion higher annually under a carbon dividends model compared with similar carbon reductions that rely on regulations.

Polling 
The Council has published numerous polls showing bipartisan support for action to address climate change and for a carbon dividends solution.

Founding members 
The Climate Leadership Council’s coalition of supporters are called Founding Members. The Council launched its Founding Members coalition in June 2017. As of August 2021, the Council had 46 Founding Members, including 25 corporations, three environmental organizations and 17 individuals.

On August 6, 2021, Exxon Mobil Corporation's membership in the Climate Leadership Council was suspended.

References 

Non-profit organizations based in the United States
Organizations established in 2017
Climate change organizations based in the United States
Climate change policy